Hold On to Me may refer to:

 "Hold On to Me" (Lauren Daigle song), 2021
 "Hold On to Me" (Courtney Love song), 2004
 "Hold On to Me" (John Michael Montgomery song), 1998
 "Hold On to Me", a song by the Cowboy Junkies from their 1996 album Lay It Down
 "Hold On to Me", a song by Elevation Worship from their 2016 album, Here as in Heaven
 "Hold On to Me", a song by Rissi Palmer from Rissi Palmer
 Hold On to Me (album), a 1988 album by the Black Sorrows
 "Hold On to Me" (The Black Sorrows song), the title track from the album